Chad London (born September 27, 1988) is a professional rugby union player who plays center for the Dallas Jackals in Major League Rugby (MLR).

He previously the Colorado Raptors and Denver Stampede in PRO Rugby. He also played for the United States national rugby union team.

Rugby career
London went to school at Palmer College of Chiropractic in Iowa, where he was an All-American. He then moved to Denver, Colorado where he began playing for the Glendale Raptors of the Pacific Rugby Premiership.

London was named the 2014 club player of the year by Rugby Today magazine after leading PRP scorers with 12 tries. London signed a contract to play professionally with the Denver Stampede in the short-lived PRO Rugby in early 2016.

International
London debuted with the U.S. national team in a 2014 match against Scotland in Houston, Texas. London was one of the best players for the U.S. during the 2016 Americas Rugby Championship.

References

American rugby union players
1988 births
Living people
Denver Stampede players
American Raptors players
United States international rugby union players
Rugby union centres
Dallas Jackals players